Leander Paes and Martina Navratilova were the defending champions but lost in the third round to Wayne and Cara Black.

The Blacks defeated Todd Woodbridge and Alicia Molik in the final, 3–6, 7–6(10–8), 6–4 to win the mixed doubles tennis title at the 2004 Wimbledon Championships.

Seeds
All seeds received a bye into the second round. 

  Mahesh Bhupathi /  Elena Likhovtseva (quarterfinals)
  Mark Knowles /  Virginia Ruano Pascual (second round)
  Mike Bryan /  Lisa Raymond (second round)
  Jonas Björkman /  Rennae Stubbs (quarterfinals)
  Paul Hanley /  Ai Sugiyama (semifinals)
  Wayne Black /  Cara Black (champions)
  Bob Bryan /  Lindsay Davenport (semifinals)
  Todd Woodbridge /  Alicia Molik (final)
  Leander Paes /  Martina Navratilova (third round)
  Cyril Suk /  Marion Bartoli (second round)
  Jonathan Erlich /  Liezel Huber (third round)
  Leoš Friedl /  Janette Husárová (third round)
  Mariano Hood /  María Vento-Kabchi (second round)
  Gastón Etlis /  Sun Tiantian (third round)
  Daniel Nestor /  Lina Krasnoroutskaya (third round)
  Lucas Arnold Ker /  Angelique Widjaja (second round)

Draw

Finals

Top half

Section 1

Section 2

Bottom half

Section 3

Section 4

References

External links

2004 Wimbledon Championships on WTAtennis.com
2004 Wimbledon Championships – Doubles draws and results at the International Tennis Federation

X=Mixed Doubles
Wimbledon Championship by year – Mixed doubles